The Ministry of Public and Business Service Delivery (formerly the Ministry of Government and Consumer Services) is a ministry of the Government of Ontario. It is responsible for ServiceOntario, which, among other responsibilities, issues driver's licenses, health cards, birth certificates and other provincial documents to Ontario residents. Additionally, it oversees the Archives of Ontario, and numerous boards and administrative authorities charged with consumer protection in specific sectors and industries, such as condominiums and travel. 

The current minister is Kaleed Rasheed, who assumed office in 2022.

History
Prior to 1972, the Department of Public Works was responsible for the function of providing and maintaining the buildings and facilities that house the operations of the provincial government.

In November 1966, the Department of Financial and Commercial Affairs was established and acquired the responsibility for the regulation of insurance companies, loan and trust companies, and the trading of securities in Ontario. In 1967, a Consumer Protection Division was established to be responsible for a newly created Consumer Protection Bureau. In 1968, it acquired further responsibility over the regulation of credit unions, cemeteries, upholstered and stuffed articles, and the sale of goods and services. In 1970, it further acquired responsibility over the incorporation of companies and the regulation of lotteries.

In 1972, the Government of Ontario was considerably re-organized as the various Departments were restructured and renamed as Ministries.

In 1972, the Ministry of Government Services was created, assuming most of the functions of the former Department of Public Works. Over the years in its various forms, the Ministry assumed various responsibility in support of the operations of the provincial government, including maintenance of government buildings; centralized services for government employees; central mail and translation services; information technology and services, etc.
 
Also in 1972, the Ministry of Consumer and Commercial Relations and assumed all responsibilities of the Department of Financial and Commercial Affairs. The new Ministry also acquired the functions associated with the promotion of public safety for boilers, elevators, building standards and fuels, the regulation of theatres, the Liquor Control Board of Ontario and the Liquor License Board of Ontario. In 1986, a standalone Ministry of Financial Institutions and assumed the responsibility over the Ontario Securities Commission and the Pension Commission of Ontario.

In 1993, the Management Board Secretariat absorbed the existing Ministry of Government Services, assuming its function in providing internal corporate services to the provincial government. 

In February 2001, the Ministry of Consumer and Commercial Relations was renamed the Ministry of Consumer and Business Services.

In 2005, the Ministry of Government Services was re-created from the merger of Management Board Secretariat and the Ministry of Consumer and Business Services. The Ministry was headed by a Minister, who was also chair of the Management Board of Cabinet. When the ministry was created, Premier Dalton McGuinty described it as the "chief operating officer of government." The position combined responsibility for consumer protection, business regulation, management of the civil service, labour negotiations and the central plumbing of government: IT, procurement, and shared services. In 2007, the Ministry was renamed Ministry of Government and Consumer Services.

One of the main projects of the ministry was the creation of ServiceOntario. When it was completed in 2011, ServiceOntario was the one-stop shop for all government retail operations. Any and all routine transactions between the government and the public are performed through ServiceOntario offices, websites, call centres or kiosks. Alongside ServiceOntario, the ministry offers access to its public records through three of its licensed service providers, one of which is ESC Corporate Services.

Responsibilities
The ministry is responsible for several key area, including:
 consumer protection and public safety
 business law
 provide Ontario government ministries and employees with corporate services including procurement, finance, HR, pay and benefits
 collect, manage and preserve historical records of the Ontario Government
 policy leadership in record-keeping, freedom of information, privacy protection, and information management

The ministry oversees a number of boards and administrative authorities, including:
 Advertising Review Board
 Bereavement Authority Of Ontario
 Business Law Modernization and Burden Reduction Council 
 Condominium Authority Of Ontario
 Condominium Management Regulatory Authority Of Ontario
 Electrical Safety Authority
 Minister's Digital and Data Taskforce
 Ontario One Call
 Ontario Motor Vehicle Industry Council
 Real Estate Council of Ontario
 Tarion Warranty Corporation
 Technical Standards and Safety Authority
 Travel Industry Council of Ontario

List of ministers

References

External links
 Ministry of Public and Business Service Delivery

Government and Consumer Services
Consumer rights agencies